Zhar may mean:

 Zhar (Great Old One), a fictional Cthulhu Mythos deity of H. P. Lovecraft
 Zhar Lestin, a fictional character in Star Wars: Knights of the Old Republic
 Zhar language, a dialect of Jarawa language in Nigeria
 Zhar, Nyuksensky District, Vologda Oblast, a place in Russia
 Zhar, Syamzhensky District, Vologda Oblast, a place in Russia
 Z'har, a 2009 film
 Žar Mountain, a mountain in Kosovo

See also
 Tsar
 Zharov, a Russian male surname, and its feminine counterpart Zharova
 Nabil El Zhar (born 1986), French professional footballer